Chah Kam (also Romanized as Chāh Kam) is a village in Dastgerdan Rural District, Dastgerdan District, Tabas County, South Khorasan Province, Iran. At the 2006 census, its population was 12, in 6 families. 

This village is located within the Asia/Tehran time zone.

References 

Populated places in Tabas County